Mukkam is a major municipality town in Kozhikode, state of Kerala, India. Mukkam is one of the major regional suburb  of the Kozhikode district. Mukkam is located about 27 km east of Calicut city on the bank of river Iruvanjippuzha, one of the major tributaries of river Chaliyar .Mukkam is also well knows for its secularistic features. The urban region of Mukkam is spread across Mukkam Municipality and the North Karassery region of Karassery Grama Panchayath. The town begins from North Karassery junction region and runs till Agasthianmuzhi Junction region. 

Mukkom is a fast developing town in Kozhikode district in the state of Kerala. It is elevated to a status of Municipality with an extend of area of 31.28 km2 with in the Thaluk of Kozhikode. 

It is the gateway to the emigrant settlements of the eastern region, Thiruvambady, Koodaranhi, Thottumukkom, Kodenchery and the commercial capital of this eastern region. Agriculture and hill products form the major share of the trade.

It is Situated about 27 km from the Calicut International Airport and 30 kms from the Calicut Railway station. There are more than 20 Higher Educational Institutions in the area of Engineering and Health and Allied Sciences and two Arts and Science Colleges.

The prestigious national level institute like National Institute of Technology, Calicut (NIT-C), Indian Institute of Management Kozhikode (IIM-K). NIELT Kozhikode, Centre for Water Resource Development and Management Kozhikode (CWRDM), Institute of Mathematics are within the vicinity of this Municipality.

Places of tourism such as Thusharagiri, Kakkadompoyil, Arippara Waterfalls, Vellarimala are within the hearsay area. It has a noted place in the freedom struggle. Freedom fighter Muhammed Abdurahiman breathed his last at Pottasseryof this Municipality. Jnanapeedam winner S.K Pottekkadu, wrote his famous novel ‘Nadan Premam’ Mukkom as its background.

Mukkam Municipality is lying within the 11.3184o N and 75.9586oE about 1& of the total area is highland, 57& slightly slope, 23% moderately slope, 4% river shore and 15% plain land.

Demographic Details

POPULATION AND DENSITY PATTERN

Mukkam municipality has a population of 40670 (2011 census) with the growth rate of 9.41 % during 2001-2011. The density of population is 1300.17/Km2. The male population is 19654 and female population is 21016.

Housing Profile

Housing Issues

Housing in Mukkam has become an issue as the population and number of families have increased. In the past housing was not a major issue as joint family system with prevalent culture. However the elder members of the family are compelled to opt for separate houses as the limited infrastructure is a hindrance to all family members. This is the most important reason behind the increased housing problem in Mukkam. Again the population growth as well as the non-availability of suitable land is another issue. Both these factors combined have a major impact on the housing picture of the Municipality.

History 
Mukkam is an immigrant town. Migration started in 1940 in the eastern hills of Malabar. Poverty and famine were among the major devastation wrought by World War II. Ordinary people in Kerala could not bear the misery caused by famine and inflation. Infectious diseases also hunted. The scarcity of resources also made the public distribution system inadequate. In those days, palm fronds, taro and taro were the staple food of the common man. There was a large population in central Travancore who made a living from agriculture. The knowledge that they would buy acres of land in Malabar if they sold the small land in the country attracted them to Malabar.
They came to Malabar without clear information and understanding about this area. Prior to the independence of India, the region was under the jurisdiction of a section of the authorities. The religious harmony of the region is as old as this land where people of different religions live. Immigration to the region began in Thiruvambadi. In 1942, the Thiruvambadi area became known as Nairkolli.
It is the confluence of a small river and an even larger river, the Iruvanji. The Thrikkudamanna Shiva Temple is located here and is believed to have been dedicated to Mahamuni Augustine. Muhammad Abdurahman Sahib, described by Gandhi of Kerala, breathed his last during the freedom struggle in Pottassery in this village. Before roads and bridges, man relied on rivers and streams for transportation and movement of goods. The face, which is surrounded by two parts and two sides, stands in front of the transport facility. Therefore, it has become a populated area here. The main occupation at that time was to cut wood from the nearby hills, tie the rope and load it on the boats and bring it to Kozhikode. The timber merchants also became the mainstay of Mukkam economy at that time. The landlords were known for their hospitality.

Location
Mukkam is located about 27 km east of Calicut city on the bank of river Iruvanjippuzha, one of the major tributaries of river Chaliyar. Nearby places include  Mavoor, Thiruvambady, Omassery, Koodaranji, Narikkuni, Koduvally, Thamarassery, Cheruvadi and Kunnamangalam, Areekode. It is under the Thiruvambadi Assembly Constituency.  Mukkam is populous in its market strength and Mukkam Muslim Orphanage. State Highway 34 (SH 34), that starts in Koyilandy and ends in Edavanna, Passes through Mukkam. The Mukkam town is now developing as an eastern suburb of Kozhikode also it is part of the educational corridor Kunnamangalam stretch.

Civic Administration

Mukkam Municipality Election 2020

In Book, Film, and Television
Hindus, Christians and Muslims co-exist in harmony adding to the diversity in faith and religion. S. K. Pottekkatt depicts Mukkam in his 1941 novel Naadan Premam and there is a memorial built on his name at the heart of the town. Ennu Ninte Moideen is a 2015 romantic thriller film written and directed by R. S. Vimal, based on the real-life story of Moideen and Kanchanamala, which happened in the 1960s in Mukkam.

Economy
Mukkam is a semi-urban region. The livelihoods of most residents revolve around agriculture and small scale businesses like the retail stores. A large chunk of the population, like other Malabar regions, work in the Middle East countries, and their remittances have a solid influence on the local economy.
Agriculture has historically been a key component of the Mukkam's economy. The most valuable agricultural products in Mukkam area are cattle, arecanut, coconut, rubber and banana. Agriculture-related businesses such as fruits and spices exporting also have a considerable economic impact on the region. Spices that grow well in this region are black pepper, mace, vanilla, nutmeg, ginger, cocoa and turmeric. These fresh and high-quality spices meet the export standards.

Transport

Road
State Highway 34 (SH 34), that starts in Koyilandy and ends in Edavanna, passes through Mukkam. Mukkam is well-connected to its suburbs with road and has several private and KSRTC buses offer scheduled services to these places. You would get direct buses to Calicut city, Thamarassery, Thiruvambadi, Koyilandy, Narikkuni, Koodaranji, Kunnamangalam, Koduvally, Balussery, Mavoor, Sulthan Bathery, Mananthavady, Manjeri, Thrissur, Nilambur, Palakkad, Kalpetta, etc. from Mukkam.  The nearest National Highway (NH 212), that connects Kozhikode with Kollegal in Karnataka via Mysore, meets with State Highway 34 at Chungam, Thamarassery.

Air
Calicut International Airport, situated to the 30 km southwest of Mukkam, is the primary airport serving the northern Kerala. People from this region mainly depend on this international airport for their domestic as well as international travel. Calicut airport ranks as the 12th busiest airport in India in terms of overall passenger traffic. People from Mukkam region could reach this airport via Mukkam-Nellikaparamba-Edavannappara route and it takes less than one hour.

Rail
There is no direct railway line that connects Mukkam with other cities. The nearest railway station is Kozhikode railway station which is about 29 kilometres from Mukkam. People who wish to visit Mukkam can reach Calicut by train and then proceed by road through Kunnamangalam and Kettangal.

Educational organizations
National Institute of Technology Calicut campus is at Kattangal which is 7 km from Mukkam. Mamo College Manassery is 4 km from the town and KMCT maintains engineering colleges, polytechnic, medical college, Ayurveda college And nursing college

Places of interest

Sri Thrikkudamanna Temple
The second most people gathered Shivaratri Festival in Kerala and 1st in Malabar, this Temple is situated in the centre of Iruvanjippuzha (Iruvanji River) dedicated to Lord Shiva Deva, with no building, no idol, no roof and Mother nature is the Temple here. Kanji Parcha (serving tasty porridge along with spicy vegetables, fruits and roots to all visitors) and Malar Nivedyam (for couples looking forward for a child, for fulfilling one's wishes ) conducted during Revathi Njattuvela (usually comes in 1st two weeks of April every year) are the famous offerings here.

Mukkam Kadavu Palam

Notable people 

 M. N. Karassery, Malayalam writer and activist
 George M. Thomas, Indian politician
 B. P. Moideen, Indian politician, film producer, and publisher
 O. Abdurahman, indian Journalist and author
 Noufal PN,Footballer

Suburbs of Mukkam
 Agastianmuzhi,Kariyakulangara,  Mambatta and Manassery, Muthalam
 Kalanthode, Nayarkuzhi and Koolimad
 Kettangal and NIT
 Omassery, Neeleswaram
 Karassery, Kodiyathur, Cheruvadi 
 Thottumukkam, Parathod and Anayamkunnu, Koodaranji.
 Chathamangalam, Chethukadavu and Varattiyakk 
 Kaithaparambu, Nellikkaparamba and Gothambaroad

News media in Mukkam 

 Manassery News (online news media)
 CTV News (channel)

See also
Kunnamangalam
 Thamarassery
Omassery
 Thiruvambady
 Mavoor
 Koduvally
 CTV MUKKAM

External sources
Nest Holidays

Mukkam website

Engineering/Medical Entrance Coaching Centre

Mukkam News website

Mukkam IT Company

Mukkam Orphanage

MAMO College

Karassery Bank

MUKKAM HOLIDAYS

Web Design and Digital marketing company

References

Thamarassery area